Elva Roscoe Kendall (February 14, 1893 – January 29, 1968) was a U.S. Representative from Kentucky.

Born near Carlisle, Kentucky, Kendall attended the public schools, YMCA School of Accountancy at New York City, and National University at Washington, D.C. He engaged as a public accountant and tax consultant, and was also interested in agricultural pursuits.

During World War I, Kendall was in the personnel office of the Sixty-first Division. He enlisted on May 1, 1918 and was discharged November 26, 1918 as a private while serving with the 11 3 Receiving Battalion, 157th Depot Brigade. He initially reported to Fort Thomas, Kentucky. He was employed as a field auditor for the United States Treasury Department 1922-1927.

Kendall was elected as a Republican to the Seventy-first Congress (March 4, 1929 – March 3, 1931). He was an unsuccessful candidate for reelection in 1930 to the Seventy-second Congress. He then resumed agricultural pursuits and his profession as a public accountant, as well as engaging in the real estate business. He was a resident of Carlisle until his death on January 29, 1968.

References

1893 births
1968 deaths
20th-century American politicians
People from Carlisle, Kentucky
United States Army soldiers
Republican Party members of the United States House of Representatives from Kentucky
National University School of Law alumni